Australia competed at the 2013 World Aquatics Championships in Barcelona, Spain from 19 July to 4 August 2013.

Medalists

| width="78%" align="left" valign="top" |

| width="22%" align="left" valign="top" |

| width="22%" align="left" valign="top" |

* – Indicates the athlete competed in preliminaries but not the final relay.

Diving

Men

Women

Open water swimming

Australia qualified seven swimmers.

Men

Women

Mixed

Swimming

Australian swimmers achieved qualifying standards in the following events (up to a maximum of 2 swimmers in each event at the A-standard entry time, and 1 at the B-standard):

Men

Cameron McEvoy tied for the eighth and final spot in the final of the 200 m freestyle with Sebastiaan Verschuren from the Netherlands. However, Verschuren withdrew from the swimoff to focus on the 100 m freestyle event which allowed McEvoy to advance to the final.

Women

Synchronised swimming

Reserves
 Amie Thompson
 Jade Haynes-Love

Water polo

Men's tournament

Team roster

Joel Dennerley
Richard Campbell
Matthew Martin
John Cotterill
Nathan Power
Jarrod Gilchrist
Aidan Roach
Aaron Younger
Joel Swift
Tyler Martin
Rhys Howden
William Miller
James Clark

Group play

Round of 16

Quarterfinal

5th–8th place semifinal

Seventh place game

Women's tournament

Team roster

Lea Barta
Jayde Appel
Hannah Buckling
Holly Lincoln-Smith
Isobel Bishop
Bronwen Knox
Rowena Webster
Glencora Ralph
Zoe Arancini
Ashleigh Southern
Keesja Gofers
Nicola Zagame
Kelsey Wakefield

Group play

Round of 16

Quarterfinal

Semifinal

Final

See also
Australia at other World Championships in 2013
 Australia at the 2013 UCI Road World Championships
 Australia at the 2013 World Championships in Athletics

References

External links
Barcelona 2013 Official Site

Nations at the 2013 World Aquatics Championships
World Aquatics Championships
Australia at the World Aquatics Championships